Saari bin Sungib is a Malaysian politician who has served as Member of the Selangor State Legislative Assembly (MLA) for Hulu Kelang since March 2008. He is a member of the National Trust Party (AMANAH), a component party of the Pakatan Harapan (PH) state ruling but federal opposition coalition. He was a member of the Malaysian Islamic Party (PAS), then component party of then Pakatan Rakyat (PR) state ruling but federal opposition coalition and member of the People's Justice Party (PKR), then component party of the Barisan Alternatif (BA) opposition coalition.

Election results

References

Living people
People from Selangor
Malaysian people of Malay descent
National Trust Party (Malaysia) politicians
Former People's Justice Party (Malaysia) politicians
Former Malaysian Islamic Party politicians
21st-century Malaysian politicians
Members of the Selangor State Legislative Assembly
1957 births